The Wayne Public Schools are a comprehensive community public school district that serves students in pre-kindergarten through twelfth grade from Wayne, in Passaic County, New Jersey, United States, in the New York City metropolitan area.

As of the 2018–19 school year, the district, comprising 14 schools, had an enrollment of 7,895 students and 666.5 classroom teachers (on an FTE basis), for a student–teacher ratio of 11.8:1.

The district is classified by the New Jersey Department of Education as being in District Factor Group "GH", the third-highest of eight groupings. District Factor Groups organize districts statewide to allow comparison by common socioeconomic characteristics of the local districts. From lowest socioeconomic status to highest, the categories are A, B, CD, DE, FG, GH, I and J.

History
Before the district opened its own secondary school in 1952, students from Wayne had attended Pompton Lakes High School. The school was called "Wayne High School" until Wayne Hills High School opened in September 1966, at which time the word "Valley" was added to the original school's name in order to differentiate between the two.

Awards and recognition
John F. Kennedy School was recognized by Governor Jim McGreevey in 2003 as one of 25 schools selected statewide for the First Annual Governor's School of Excellence award.

Schools
Schools in the district (with 2018–19 enrollment data from the National Center for Education Statistics) are:

Elementary schools
Randall Carter Elementary School (334 students; in grades K-5)
Jeffrey Wojcik, Principal
Theunis Dey Elementary School (437; PreK-5)
Necole Jadick, Principal
James Fallon Elementary School (381; K-5)
Ethan Maayan, Principal
John F. Kennedy Elementary School (416; K-5)
Kolleen Myers, Principal
Lafayette Elementary School (301; K-5)
Matthew Kriley, Principal
Packanack Elementary School (441; PreK-5)
Roger Rogalin, Principal
Pines Lake Elementary School (380; PreK-5)
Jose Celis, Principal
Ryerson Elementary School (273; K-5)
Debbie Foti, Principal
Albert P. Terhune Elementary School (399; PreK-5)
Suzana Adamo, Principal
Middle schools
Schuyler-Colfax Middle School (693; 6-8)
Matthew Mignanelli, Principal
George Washington Middle School (653; 6-8)
Jack E. Leonard, Principal
Anthony Wayne Middle School (555; 6-8)
David Aulenbach, Principal
High schools (grades 9-12)
Wayne Hills High School (1,285; 9-12 - for students living on and north of Ratzer Road) 
Michael Rewick, Principal
Wayne Valley High School (1,250; 9-12 - for students living south of Ratzer Road)
Kenneth J. Palczewski, Principal

Administration
Core members of the district's administration are:
Dr. Mark Toback, Superintendent
William Moffitt, Business Administrator / Board Secretary

Board of education
The district's board of education, comprised of nine members, sets policy and oversees the fiscal and educational operation of the district through its administration. As a Type II school district, the board's trustees are elected directly by voters to serve three-year terms of office on a staggered basis, with three seats up for election each year held (since 2012) as part of the November general election. The board appoints a superintendent to oversee the day-to-day operation of the district.

References

External links
Wayne Schools Site
 
School Data for the Wayne Public Schools, National Center for Education Statistics

Wayne, New Jersey
New Jersey District Factor Group GH
School districts in Passaic County, New Jersey